Zhympity (Jympity; Russian: Жымпиты) is a village in north-western Kazakhstan. It is the administrative center of Syrym District in West Kazakhstan Region. Population:

References

Populated places in West Kazakhstan Region